Takakazu Kuriyama (died 1 April 2015) was a Japanese politician who served as ambassador to Malaysia and the United States.

Early life and education
Kuriyama was born in Tokyo. His father, Kuriyama Shigeru, was a diplomat and judge in the Supreme Court of Japan.

He attended the University of Tokyo.

Diplomatic career
In 1954, Kuriyama joined the Foreign Ministry. He held the position of Director General of the North American Affairs Bureau, and was appointed Vice Minister in May 1989.

He was involved in the negotiations that led to the 1971 Okinawa Reversion Agreement, which returned the Okinawa Prefecture to Japan from the United States. The next year, he helped draft a statement on normalising diplomacy with China.

He served as ambassador to Malaysia during the mid-1980s, and became ambassador to the United States in 1992. He left the position in 1995.

Personal life
His wife, Masako, was the daughter of a Japanese Supreme Court judge.

He died on 1 April 2015 in a Tokyo hospital, after suffering from pneumonia.

References

2015 deaths
Ambassadors of Japan to the United States
Ambassadors of Japan to Malaysia